Linochilus is a genus of flowering plants belonging to the family Asteraceae.

Its native range is Costa Rica to Northwestern Venezuela and Ecuador.

Species
Species:

Linochilus alveolatus 
Linochilus anactinotus 
Linochilus antioquensis 
Linochilus apiculatus 
Linochilus bicolor 
Linochilus camargoanus 
Linochilus cayambensis 
Linochilus chrysotrichus 
Linochilus cinerascens 
Linochilus colombianus 
Linochilus coriaceus 
Linochilus costaricensis 
Linochilus crassifolius 
Linochilus cyparissias 
Linochilus ellipticus 
Linochilus eriophorus 
Linochilus farallonensis 
Linochilus floribundus 
Linochilus fosbergii 
Linochilus frontinensis 
Linochilus glutinosus 
Linochilus grantii 
Linochilus heterophyllus 
Linochilus huertasii 
Linochilus inesianus 
Linochilus jaramilloi 
Linochilus jenesanus 
Linochilus juajibioyi 
Linochilus juliani 
Linochilus lacunosus 
Linochilus leiocladus 
Linochilus micradenius 
Linochilus mutiscuanus 
Linochilus nevadensis 
Linochilus oblongifolius 
Linochilus obtusus 
Linochilus ocanensis 
Linochilus ochraceus 
Linochilus parvifolius 
Linochilus perijaensis 
Linochilus phylicoides 
Linochilus pittieri 
Linochilus rangelii 
Linochilus revolutus 
Linochilus rhododendroides 
Linochilus rhomboidalis 
Linochilus ritterbushii 
Linochilus romeroi 
Linochilus rosmarinifolius 
Linochilus rupestris 
Linochilus santamartae 
Linochilus saxatilis 
Linochilus schultzii 
Linochilus tachirensis 
Linochilus tamanus 
Linochilus tenuifolius 
Linochilus tergocanus 
Linochilus venezuelensis 
Linochilus violaceus 
Linochilus weddellii

References

Astereae
Asteraceae genera